"Let the Good Times Rock" is a 1989 single released by the Swedish hard rock band Europe. It was the third single from their album Out of This World. The single peaked at number 85 on the UK singles chart.

Track listing
"Let the Good Times Rock"
"Never Say Die"
"Carrie"
"Seven Doors Hotel"

Personnel
Joey Tempest − lead vocals
Kee Marcello − guitars and background vocals
John Levén   − bass guitar
Mic Michaeli − keyboards and background vocals
Ian Haugland − drums and background vocals

References 

1989 singles
Europe (band) songs
Songs written by Joey Tempest
1988 songs
Song recordings produced by Ron Nevison
Epic Records singles